A number of private universities in Canada have been granted the authority to confer academic degrees from a provincial authority. Although private universities were established in several Canadian provinces, the majority of universities in the country remains publicly-funded.

The oldest private universities in Canada operated as seminaries or as religiously-affiliated institutions, although several secular for-profit and not-for-profit private universities were established in Canada during the late-20th and early 21st century. In addition to private universities based in Canada, the provinces of Alberta, British Columbia, and Ontario also holds several satellite campuses for private universities based in the United States.

List of private universities by province

Alberta
Post-secondary degree programs at private universities in Alberta are approved by the province's Minister of Advanced Education as reviewed by the Campus Alberta Quality Council. The following are private universities based in Alberta that operate degree programs approved by Alberta's Minister of Advanced Education: 

In addition to private universities that are based in Alberta, the cities of Calgary and Edmonton also hosts satellite campuses for private universities based in the United States, including the City University of Seattle, Gonzaga University, and the University of Portland. Degree programs offered at these satellite campuses are approved by Alberta's Minister of Advanced Education.

From 2002 to 2009, the Taylor University College and Seminary was authorized to confer undergraduate degrees. In 2009 the institution ceased operating an undergraduate program, and its authority to confer degrees was rescinded by the government of Alberta.

British Columbia
Post-secondary degree programs at private universities in British Columbia are authorized under the provincial Degree Authorization Act. The following are private universities based in British Columbia, whose degree-granting authority was authorized under the Degree Authorization Act:

In addition to private universities based in British Columbia, several US-based private universities also operate a satellite campus in Vancouver; including Adler University, City University of Seattle, Fairleigh Dickinson University, and Northeastern University. Gonzaga University also operates a satellite campus in Kelowna. The aforementioned universities that operate satellite campuses in British Columbia all operate degree programs authorized under the province's Degree Authorization Act.

Manitoba
There exists several religious-affiliated private universities in Manitoba that operate degree programs approved by the provincial government. The following Manitoba-based private universities are provided the authority to accept international students under the province's International Education Act:

New Brunswick
There exists several private universities in New Brunswick which are either recognized under the province's Degree Granting Act, or as a privately chartered university. They include:

Lansbridge University was a former private university in New Brunswick that ceased operations in 2010.

Ontario
There are several private universities based in Ontario with partial degree-granting authority as authorized by an act of the Legislative Assembly of Ontario. The majority of these institutions are faith-based. The following are private universities based in Ontario, that were authorized to grant degrees in Ontario through ministerial consent:

In addition to private universities based in Ontario, the province also hosts satellite campuses for two US-based private universities, Niagara University and Northeastern University; the former in Vaughan and the latter in Toronto. These institutions were granted the authority to confer academic degrees through ministerial consent.

See also
 Higher education in Canada
 Private education in Canada
 List of colleges in Canada
 List of universities in Canada

Notes

References

private
Private universities and colleges in Canada